Vezirly is a village in the Tovuz Rayon of Azerbaijan.

References
 

Populated places in Tovuz District